is a former Japanese football player.

Playing career
Sakai was born in Fukuoka Prefecture on May 19, 1975. After graduating from Kansai University, he joined his local club Avispa Fukuoka in 1998. He played many matches as defensive midfielder in first season. However his opportunity to play decreased in 1999 and retired end of 1999 season.

Club statistics

References

External links

1975 births
Living people
Kansai University alumni
Association football people from Fukuoka Prefecture
Japanese footballers
J1 League players
Avispa Fukuoka players
Association football midfielders